The R692 road is a regional road in Ireland linking Cashel, County Tipperary to Callan, County Kilkenny. It passes through Fethard and Mullinahone en route, and meets the M8 motorway 1km east of Cashel.

See also
Roads in Ireland
National primary road
National secondary road

References
Roads Act 1993 (Classification of Regional Roads) Order 2006 – Department of Transport

Regional roads in the Republic of Ireland
Roads in County Kilkenny
Roads in County Tipperary